The 2016 BBL Playoffs was the concluding postseason of the 2015–16 Basketball Bundesliga season. The Playoffs started on 7 May and ended on 12 June 2016.

Playoff qualifying

Bracket

Quarterfinals
The quarterfinals were played in a best of five format from 7 to 19 May 2016.

Brose Baskets vs s.Oliver Baskets

Bayern Munich vs MHP Riesen Ludwigsburg

Skyliners Frankfurt vs Alba Berlin

EWE Baskets Oldenburg vs ratiopharm Ulm

Semifinals
The semifinals were played in a best of five format from 20 May to 2 June 2016.

Brose Baskets vs Bayern Munich

Skyliners Frankfurt vs ratiopharm Ulm

Final
The final will be played in a best of five format from 5 to 19 June 2016.

References

External links
German League official website  

BBL Playoffs
Playoffs